The Yulhyeon Tunnel is a railway tunnel in South Korea, which opened in December 2016, and is currently the world's fourth longest railway tunnel at . The tunnel, which consists of a double-track tube, is part of the  Suseo–Pyeongtaek high-speed railway that connects Suseo station in the southeastern part of Seoul with the Gyeongbu high-speed railway. The threading into the older high-speed line is in the south of the city of Pyeongtaek. The tunnel itself takes up about 82% of the total new line. The average cruising speed is about  due to the intermediate stop at Dongtan Station in the southern part of the tunnel.

Structural issues 
The major sections of Yulhyeon Tunnel has been built over the seismic fault called Singal Fault, which led the structural stability in question. Korea Rail Network Authority argued that "the diversion [of the line outside of the fault zone] was impossible since all those corresponding regions around the line were within the zone".

On the 14th of April, 2021 an audit performed by Board of Audit and Inspection revealed structural and design flaws that have been present virtually since the opening of the tunnel. The audit argued that several factors, including negligent geological surveying and unauthorized construction methods caused the trackbed to deform, rendering the track structure uneven which ultimately resulted in the vibration of the trains, reducing the highest operational speed from 240km/h to as low as 90km/h in certain sections. In the wake of these flaws the Korea Rail Network Authority were ordered to prepare a comprehensive reinforcement plan.

References

Tunnels in South Korea